Benjamin Russell (October 16, 1804 – March 3, 1885) was an American artist best known for his accurate watercolors of whaling ships working in New England. Born to a wealthy family in New Bedford, Massachusetts, Russell started drawing and painting in his late 30s, after a few years spent working as a cooper aboard a whaling ship.

Russell's depiction of perspective and depth are stiff and flat, and his images "were appreciated more for their accurate representation than their artistic value."  However, most of his work is perfectly to scale, resembling control drawings, and Russell watercolours were some of the better views of the mid-19th-century American whaling industry, until photography became available in the 1850s.

Russell began making lithographs in 1848, and began teaching art in Rhode Island, after the American Civil War ended in 1865.

Image gallery

Further reading
 Robert L. Carothers and John L. Marsh. The Whale and the Panorama. Nineteenth-Century Fiction, Vol. 26, No. 3 (Dec., 1971), pp. 319–328.
 Kevin J. Avery. "Whaling Voyage Round the World": Russell and Purrington's Moving Panorama and Herman Melville's "Mighty Book."  American Art Journal, Vol. 22, No. 1 (Spring, 1990), pp. 50–78.
 Forbes, Allan. Whale Ships and Whaling Scenes as Portrayed by Benjamin Russell (1955)

References

External links

New Bedford Whaling Museum biography 

1804 births
1885 deaths
19th-century American painters
American male painters
American art educators
American lithographers
19th-century American male artists